Joseph Paul Jensen (born February 6, 1983, in Maple Grove, Minnesota) is a retired professional ice hockey center.  He played six games with the Carolina Hurricanes of the National Hockey League.

Playing career
Jensen was drafted in 2003 by the Pittsburgh Penguins while playing for St. Cloud State University of the Western Collegiate Hockey Association.  He joined the professional ranks in 2006, playing 26 games with the Wilkes-Barre/Scranton Penguins, and 28 games with the Wheeling Nailers, the ECHL affiliate of the Penguins.  Jensen joined the Carolina Hurricanes in a trade on January 31, 2008, in exchange for David Gove to the Pittsburgh Penguins. He scored his first National Hockey League goal in his third game with the Hurricanes on March 19, 2008 against Johan Hedberg of the Atlanta Thrashers. He played six games for the Hurricanes in 2008.

After a season off, he went to Europe and played in Italy's Serie A with HC Pustertal Wölfe where he played for three seasons.

He signed a short-term contract with the Nottingham Panthers of the Elite Ice Hockey League in October 2013. He retired part-way through the season on January 8, 2014.

Personal life
He is the nephew of former NHLer David Jensen and son of Paul Jensen, who was a member of the 1976 United States Olympic ice hockey team. He is cousin with Nick Jensen.

Career statistics

References

External links

1983 births
Living people
Albany River Rats players
American men's ice hockey centers
Carolina Hurricanes players
HC Pustertal Wölfe players
Ice hockey players from Minnesota
Nottingham Panthers players
People from Maple Grove, Minnesota
Pittsburgh Penguins draft picks
St. Cloud State Huskies men's ice hockey players
Sioux Falls Stampede players
Wheeling Nailers players
Wilkes-Barre/Scranton Penguins players